Ernest "Nestl" Aljančič (5 May 1945 – 21 August 2021) was a Slovenian ice hockey player and ice hockey official.

Career
Ernest Aljančič was born in Ljubljana, the son of Slovenian ice hockey player Ernest Aljančič. He became an ice hockey player for HDD Olimpija Ljubljana for fifteen seasons. He also played six matches for the Yugoslavia national ice hockey team.

Aljančič was the President of the Ice Hockey Federation of Slovenia for fifteen years.

References

1945 births
2021 deaths
Slovenian ice hockey players
HDD Olimpija Ljubljana players
Sportspeople from Ljubljana